Søren Bough (19 June 1873 – 11 November 1939) was a Norwegian sport shooter. He was born in Drammen, and his club was Drammen Skytterlag. He competed in military rifle at the 1912 Summer Olympics in Stockholm.

References

External links

1873 births
1939 deaths
Sportspeople from Drammen
Shooters at the 1912 Summer Olympics
Olympic shooters of Norway
Norwegian male sport shooters